Alexei Semyonov (born December 10, 1986) is a Russian professional ice hockey goaltender. He is currently playing with HC Lada Togliatti of the Kontinental Hockey League (KHL).

Semyonov made his Kontinental Hockey League debut playing with HC Lada Togliatti during the 2009–10 KHL season.

References

External links

1986 births
Living people
HC Lada Togliatti players
Russian ice hockey goaltenders
People from Samara Oblast
Sportspeople from Samara Oblast